Undercover Grandpa is a 2017 Canadian action comedy film directed by Érik Canuel and starring James Caan, Jessica Walter, Louis Gossett Jr., Dylan Everett, Paul Sorvino and Kenneth Welsh.

Plot
Jake and Wendall are two high school friends trying to get Jake a date with Angie.  She agrees to a date for an upcoming party but Jake's parents insist Jake stay home for a dinner with Grandpa Lou.  Jake is going to miss his first date with the girl of his dreams and no less has to hear crazy Grandpa's dubious war stories again.  Grandpa is paranoid and sees the enemy around every corner.

Angie gets kidnapped by a Russian General Komencho.  Unknown to Jake, Grandpa is a retired intelligence officer.  He is unable to get any help from government officials.  Grandpa Lou gets his grandson's trust and they decide to rescue Angie on their own.

Grandpa collects together Wolf, Harry, Mother and Giovani, his old group who were known as the 'Devil's Scum'.  Also,  to theJake enlists the computer and cell phone expertise of his friend, Wendall.  There are a lot of comic situations and corny lines between the young and old characters.

Grandpa's forces defeat the Russians and Angie is freed.  As Maddy Harcourt government agents arrive on the scene,  Grandpa is seen grabbing his chest and is rushed off to the hospital.

The next scene takes us to a graveside funeral for Grandpa Lou.  Family and friends pay tribute with grandson Jake crying.  The old timers present Lou's dogtags to Jake.

One month later a car pulls up in front of Jake's home.  Grandpa Lou gets out and tells Jake that his death was only a cover like his "old man crazy act" was a cover for his first retirement.

Grandpa and Maddy then drive off for a life in Mexico.

Cast
James Caan as Grandpa - Major Lou Crawford
Dylan Everett as Jake Bouchard
Greta Onieogou as Angie Wagner
Jesse Bostick as Wendall
Jessica Walter as Madelein 'Maddy' Harcourt
Paul Braunstein as General Komenkho
Louis Gossett Jr. as Mother
Kenneth Welsh as Harry Nederlander
Paul Sorvino as Giovanni
Lawrence Dane as Wolf
Jennifer Robertson as Mrs. Bouchard
Jonathan Higgins as Mr. Bouchard

Reception
Sandie Angulo-Chen of Common Sense Media gave the film three stars out of five.  Frank Scheck of The Hollywood Reporter gave the film a negative review describing it as "(n)either remotely thrilling or funny" and that it "isn't any fun."  Edward Douglas of Film Journal International also gave the film a negative review and wrote "It’s hard to call Undercover Grandpa a 'comedy,' since there’s never anything particularly funny about it." The film was released on Netflix streaming on November 1, 2017.

References

External links
 
 
 

2017 films
Canadian comedy films
English-language Canadian films
Vertical Entertainment films
Films directed by Érik Canuel
Films about old age
2010s English-language films
2010s Canadian films